Social business was defined by Nobel Peace Prize laureate Professor Muhammad Yunus and is described in his books. 

In these books, Yunus defined a social business as a business:
 Created and designed to address a social problem
 A non-loss, non-dividend company, i.e.
 It is financially self-sustainable and
 Profits realized by the business are reinvested in the business itself (or used to start other social businesses), with the aim of increasing social impact, for example expanding the company’s reach, improving the products or services or in other ways subsidizing the social mission.

More recently a wider body of academic research has looked at how the Blockchain and specifically smart contracts can support the development of the social business concept. Researchers are of the view that the Blockchain alongside smart contracts can act as a catalyst for sustainable social business.

Unlike a profit-maximizing business, the prime aim of a social business is not to maximize profits (although generating profits is desired). Furthermore, business owners are not receiving any dividend out of the business profits, if any.

On the other hand, unlike a non-profit, a social business is not dependent on donations or on private or public grants to survive and to operate, because, as any other business, it is self-sustainable. Furthermore, unlike a non-profit, where funds are spent only once on the field, funds in a social business are invested to increase and improve the business's operations on the field on an indefinite basis. Per Yunus: "A charity dollar has only one life; a social business dollar can be invested over and over again."

Philosophically, social business is based on what Yunus identifies as the two basic motives of human beings, selfishness and selflessness. Selfishly, people do seek profit through business; however, social business is also based on the latter motive people by performing philanthropic services, like establishing churches, mosques, synagogues, art museums, public parks, health clinics or community centers. For Yunus, the profits made through a social business's operations are less important than the beneficial effects it has on society. Muhammad Yunus has more recently founded  Yunus Social Business (YSB) to study, support, and invest in young social businesses.

Seven principles of social business
These were developed by Professor Muhammad Yunus and Hans Reitz, the co-founder of Grameen Creative Lab:

 Business objective will be to overcome poverty, or one or more problems (such as education, health, technology access, and environment) which threaten people and society; not profit maximization.
 Financial and economic sustainability
 Investors get back their investment amount only. No dividend is given beyond investment money
 When investment amount is paid back, company profit stays with the company for expansion and improvement
 Gender sensitive and environmentally conscious
 Workforce gets market wage with better working conditions
 ...Do it with joy

See also

Impact Investing
Social entrepreneur
Social entrepreneurship
Social enterprise
Double bottom line
Triple bottom line
List of social enterprises
Sustainopreneurship
Base of the pyramid
Social Business Day

References

 Yunus Muhammad, Moingeon Bertrand, Laurence Lehmann-Ortega (2010), "Building Social Business Models: Lessons from the Grameen Experience”, April-June, vol 43, n° 2-3, Long Range Planning,  p. 308-325" 

 Agafonow, Alejandro and Cam, Donaldson (2015), "The Economic Rationale Behind the Social Business Model: A Research Agenda," Vol 5, No 1, Social Business,  pp. 5-16.

Social economy
 
Economic development